The jumping translocation breakpoint protein (JTB), also known as prostate androgen-regulated protein (PAR), is a protein that in humans is encoded by the JTB gene. It is an orphan receptor with unknown function.

The JTB family of proteins contains several jumping translocation breakpoint proteins or JTBs. Jumping translocation (JT) is an unbalanced translocation that comprises amplified chromosomal segments jumping to various telomeres. JTB has been found to fuse with the telomeric repeats of acceptor telomeres in a case of JT. Homo sapiens JTB (hJTB) encodes a transmembrane protein that is highly conserved among divergent eukaryotic species. JT results in a hJTB truncation, which potentially produces an hJTB product devoid of the transmembrane domain. hJTB is located in a gene-rich region at 1q21, called epidermal differentiation complex (EDC). JTB has also been implicated in prostatic carcinomas.

References

Further reading

External links 
 PDBe-KB provides an overview of all the structure information available in the PDB for Human Protein JTB

Protein families
Telomere-related genes
Telomere-related proteins
Genes on human chromosome 1